The Hyderabad Airport  is a domestic airport in Hyderabad, Sindh, Pakistan. It is very close to the Pakistan Army's Sindh Regimental Centre and the HDA Kohsar Housing Society. The airport is now closed to commercial traffic as of 2013.

History 
Hyderabad Airport was closed to commercial traffic in 1998. It reopened on 19 August 2008 with Pakistan International Airlines announcing flights twice weekly to Islamabad and Lahore via Nawabshah.

However, the airport was closed again to commercial traffic in 2013 due to financial losses and other reasons

Events 
On 25 May 1998, PIA Flight 544 was a flight that was hijacked in Turbat. The final stand off between the hijackers and armed forces took place at Hyderabad Airport, resulting in the eventual capture of two of the three hijackers. The third was killed.

See also 
 List of airports in Pakistan
 Airlines of Pakistan
 Transport in Pakistan
 Pakistan Civil Aviation Authority

References

External links 

Airports in Sindh
Hyderabad District, Pakistan
Buildings and structures in Hyderabad, Sindh